The Senegambian languages, traditionally known as the Northern West Atlantic, or in more recent literature sometimes confusingly as the Atlantic languages, are a branch of Atlantic–Congo languages centered on Senegal, with most languages spoken there and in neighboring southern Mauritania, Gambia, Guinea-Bissau, and Guinea. The transhumant Fula, however, have spread with their languages from Senegal across the western and central Sahel. The most populous unitary language is Wolof, the national language of Senegal, with four million native speakers and millions more second-language users. There are perhaps 13 million speakers of the various varieties of Fula, and over a million speakers of Serer. The most prominent feature of the Senegambian languages is that they are devoid of tone, unlike the vast majority of Atlantic-Congo languages.

Classification
David Sapir (1971) proposed a West Atlantic branch of the Niger–Congo languages that included a Northern branch largely synonymous with Senegambian. However, Sapir's West Atlantic and its branches turned out to be geographic and typological rather than genealogical groups. The only investigation since then, Segerer & Pozdniakov (2010, 2017), removed the Southern Atlantic languages. The remaining (Northern or Senegambian) languages are characterized by a lack of tone. The Serer–Fulani–Wolof branch is characterized by consonant mutation.

Serer and Fula share noun-class suffixes.

The inclusion of the poorly attested Nalu languages is uncertain.

Several classifications, including the one used by Ethnologue 20, show Fula as being more closely related to Wolof than it is to Serer, due to a copy error in the literature.

The Max Planck Institute for Evolutionary Anthropology classifies the Senegambian languages under the name North-Central Atlantic in its Glottolog database.

Consonant mutation
The Senegambian languages are well known for their consonant mutation, a phenomenon in which the initial consonant of a word changes depending on its morphological and/or syntactic environment. In Fula, for example, the initial consonant of many nouns changes depending on whether it is singular or plural:

{|
| pul-lo || "Fulani person" || ful-ɓe || "Fulani people"
|-
| guj-jo || "thief" || wuy-ɓe || "thieves"
|}

Noun classes
The West Atlantic languages are defined by their noun-class systems, which are similar to those found in other Niger–Congo languages, most famously the Bantu languages. Most West Atlantic, and indeed Niger–Congo, noun-class systems are marked with prefixes, and linguists generally believe that this reflects the proto-Niger–Congo system. The languages of the Fula–Serer branch of Senegambian, however, have noun-class suffixes or combinations of prefixes and suffixes. Joseph Greenberg argued that the suffixed forms arose from independent postposed determiners that agreed with the noun class:

CL-Noun CL-Det → CL-Noun-CL → Noun-CL

Comparative vocabulary
Comparison of basic vocabulary words of the Senegambian languages:

References

Sapir, David. 1971. "West Atlantic: An Inventory of the Languages, Their Noun-class Systems and Consonant Alternation". In Sebeok, ed, Current Trends in Linguistics, 7: Linguistics in Sub-Saharan Africa., 45–112. Mouton. 
Pozdniakov, Konstantin & Segerer, Guillaume (2017). "A Genealogical classification of Atlantic languages." (Draft) To appear in: Lüpke, Friederike (ed.) The Oxford guide to the Atlantic languages of West Africa: Oxford:Oxford University Press.
 Pozdniakov, Konstantin. 2022. Proto-Fula–Sereer: Lexicon, morphophonology, and noun classes. (Niger-Congo Comparative Studies 3). Berlin: Language Science Press. DOI: 10.5281/zenodo.5820515 . https://langsci-press.org/catalog/book/325. Open Access.

 
Atlantic languages